"My Buddy" is a popular song with music written by Walter Donaldson, and lyrics by Gus Kahn. The song was published in 1922 and early popular versions were by Henry Burr (1922), Ernest Hare (1923) and Ben Bernie (also 1923).

Other recorded versions

Alvino Rey
Gene Autry
Chet Baker (1953)
Count Basie (1947)
Teresa Brewer - included in her album Music, Music, Music (1955).
Benny Carter
Rosemary Clooney - included in her 1983 album My Buddy.
Harry Connick Sr.
Bing Crosby - recorded December 30, 1940 with Victor Young and his Orchestra. 
Johnny Dankworth - Too Cool For The Blues (2010)
Bobby Darin - included in the album Oh! Look at Me Now (1962)
Doris Day - included in the album I'll See You in My Dreams (1951).
Judith Durham
Connie Francis (1963)
Jimmy Forrest (1951)
Stan Getz
Jackie Gleason
Eydie Gormé - included in her album Eydie Gormé – Vamps The Roaring 20's (1958).
Doctor John (1989)
Al Jolson
Jerry Gray (1945)
Lionel Hampton
Coleman Hawkins
Earl Hines (1974)
Harry James and his Orchestra (vocal: Frank Sinatra) (recorded August 17, 1939)
Miyuki Koga
Mario Lanza
Lena Horne
Sammy Kaye - with a vocal by Tommy Ryan, reached the Billboard charts briefly in 1942.
Guy Lombardo
Glenn Miller
The Mills Brothers - for their album Mmmm ... The Mills Brothers (1958)
Jaye P. Morgan
Anne Murray - 2004 on I'll Be Seeing You (Anne Murray album)
Jimmy Nail
Tony O'Malley
Dinah Shore (1949)
Nancy Sinatra (1966)
Kate Smith
Kay Starr
Sonny Stitt
Barbra Streisand - on her 1974 album The Way We Were.
Mel Tormé (1949)
Billy Vaughn
Jerry Jeff Walker - A Man Must Carry On (1977)
Barry White
Bob Wills
Glenn Frey  The lyrics are different than the original by Gus Kahn
Jeff Healey
Christina Grimmie for the movie The Matchbreaker (2016)

Film appearances
1927 Wings
1951 I'll See You in My Dreams - sung by Doris Day
1980 The Black Marble
"Blue Bell Boy", the 4th episode (aired 2012) of the third season of HBO's crime drama Boardwalk Empire, ends with Al Capone singing the song to his deaf son, Sonny.

References

External links
 Song lyric

Songs with music by Walter Donaldson
Songs with lyrics by Gus Kahn
Pop standards
1922 songs
Nancy Sinatra songs